Chen Yung-Jui received his BS in Physics from National Tsing Hua University in 1969 and Ph.D. in Physics at the University of Pennsylvania (1976). After a brief postdoctoral period at Penn, he joined the Advanced Microelectronic Laboratory at McDonnell Douglas Astronautics Co. in 1977. From 1980 to 1987, Dr. Chen conducted fiber optical communications related research at GTE Laboratories. During the ten years in industry, he worked on MOS/MNOS VLSI technology, wafer scale integration, Ultra-fast optical spectroscopy, nonlinear optics of semiconductors and organic polymers, integrated optics and optoelectronic devices. In 1987, he moved to academe and became one of the founding faculty members of the Department of Electrical Engineering at University of Maryland, Baltimore County.

Dr. Chen is currently the UMBC Presidential Research Professor, a full professor of Computer Science and Electrical Engineering and the Director of Photonics Technology Laboratory. His group's current research interest covers photonic integrated device design, processing, testing, material sciences and physics, WDM broadband optical communications and networking.  Dr. Chen is a fellow of Optical Society of America and Photonics Society of Chinese Americans, senior member of IEEE and member of American Physical Society.

External links
 Chen Yung-Jui's website

 

University of Maryland, Baltimore County faculty
Senior Members of the IEEE
Living people
National Tsing Hua University alumni
American people of Taiwanese descent
Year of birth missing (living people)